In seven-dimensional Euclidean geometry, the cyclotruncated 7-simplex honeycomb is a space-filling tessellation (or honeycomb). The tessellation fills space by 7-simplex, truncated 7-simplex, bitruncated 7-simplex, and tritruncated 7-simplex facets. These facet types occur in proportions of 1:1:1:1 respectively in the whole honeycomb.

Structure
It can be constructed by eight sets of parallel hyperplanes that divide space. The hyperplane intersections generate  cyclotruncated 6-simplex honeycomb divisions on each hyperplane.

Related polytopes and honeycombs

See also
Regular and uniform honeycombs in 7-space:
7-cubic honeycomb
7-demicubic honeycomb
7-simplex honeycomb
Omnitruncated 7-simplex honeycomb
331 honeycomb

Notes

References 
 Norman Johnson Uniform Polytopes, Manuscript (1991)
 Kaleidoscopes: Selected Writings of H.S.M. Coxeter, edited by F. Arthur Sherk, Peter McMullen, Anthony C. Thompson, Asia Ivic Weiss, Wiley-Interscience Publication, 1995,  
 (Paper 22) H.S.M. Coxeter, Regular and Semi Regular Polytopes I, [Math. Zeit. 46 (1940) 380-407, MR 2,10] (1.9 Uniform space-fillings)
 (Paper 24) H.S.M. Coxeter, Regular and Semi-Regular Polytopes III, [Math. Zeit. 200 (1988) 3-45]

Honeycombs (geometry)
8-polytopes